The 2015–16 United Counties League season (known as the 2015–16 ChromaSport & Trophies United Counties League for sponsorship reasons) was the 109th in the history of the United Counties League, a football competition in England.

Premier Division

The Premier Division featured 19 clubs which competed in the division last season, along with three new clubs:
Kirby Muxloe, transferred from the Midland League
Northampton Spencer, promoted from Division One
Rothwell Corinthians, promoted from Division One

In addition, Thurnby Nirvana changed their name to Leicester Nirvana.

Three clubs have applied for promotion to Step 4: AFC Kempston Rovers, Kirby Muxloe and Leicester Nirvana.

League table

Results

Division One

Division One featured 18 clubs which competed in the division last season, along with two new clubs:
Long Buckby, relegated from the Premier Division
Oakham United, promoted from the Peterborough and District Football League

League table

Results
All Games and results involving St Neots Town Saints have all been annulled.

References

9
United Counties League seasons